Saint Spyridon, Bishop of Trimythous also sometimes written Saint Spiridon (c. 270 – 348) is a saint honoured in both the Eastern and Western Christian traditions.

Life
Spyridon was born in Askeia, in Cyprus.  He worked as a shepherd and was known for his great piety.  He married and had one daughter, Irene.  Upon the death of his wife, Spyridon entered a monastery, and their daughter, a convent.

Spyridon eventually became Bishop of Trimythous, or Tremithous (today called Tremetousia), in the district of Larnaca.  He took part in the First Ecumenical Council of Nicaea (325), where he was instrumental in countering the theological arguments of Arius and his followers.

He reportedly converted a pagan philosopher to Christianity by using a potsherd to illustrate how one single entity (a piece of pottery) could be composed of three unique entities (fire, water and clay); a metaphor for the Christian doctrine of the Trinity.

As soon as Spyridon finished speaking, the shard is said to have miraculously burst into flame, water dripped on the ground, and only dust remained in his hand (other accounts of this event say that it was a brick he held in his hand).

After the council, Saint Spyridon returned to his diocese in Tremithous. He later fell into disfavor during the persecutions of the emperor Maximinus, but died peacefully in old age. 

Spyridon was popular in Byzantine literature. A poem, now lost, was dedicated to him by his pupil Triphyllios. It inspired two 7th-century vitae, one by Theodore of Paphos (c. 655) and another possibly by Leontios of Neapolis. The former was used by Simeon Metaphrastes. Arabic and Georgian hagiographies also survive.

Relics

When the Arabs took Cyprus, Spyridon's body was disinterred and taken to Constantinople.  The relics were found to be incorrupt, and contained a sprig of basil, the "royal plant," both of which were taken as a sign of divine confirmation of his sanctity.

When, in 1453, Constantinople fell to the Ottomans, Spyridon's relics were removed again; this time, to the island of Corfu by a Corfiote monk called Kalohairetis (Καλοχαιρέτης), where they remain to this day, in Saint Spyridon Church.

The relics are taken in procession every Palm Sunday and on other special occasions, for veneration by the faithful. All Philharmonics of Corfu, including the Philharmonic Society of Corfu take part in these ceremonial events. The relic of his right hand was located in Rome in the Church of Santa Maria in Vallicella, to which it was given by Pope Clement VIII to Cardinal Cesare of Baronio of the Oratory of Saint Philip Neri. There it remained until 1986 when the right arm of Saint Spyridon was brought back to Kerkyra.

Patron saint and miracles

Patron saint

Spyridon is the patron saint of potters (from the miracle of the potsherd, above) and of the island of Corfu where he is called "Αγιος Σπυρίδων ο πολιούχος", "Saint Spyridon, the Keeper of the City", for the miracle of expelling the plague (πανούκλη) from the island. He is also the patron saint of Piraeus where he is celebrated and honored every year on 12 December.

Corfu

It is believed by the faithful that the plague, on its way out of the island, scratched one of the fortification stones of the old citadel (Palaio Frourio) to indicate its fury for being expelled. This scratch is still shown to visitors.

St. Spyridon is also believed to have saved the island at the second great siege of Corfu which took place in 1716. At that time the Turkish army and naval force led by the great Sultan Achmet III appeared in Butrinto opposite Corfu.

On July 8 the Turkish fleet carrying 33,000 men sailed to Corfu from Butrinto and established a beachhead in Ipsos the same day the Venetian fleet encountered the Turkish fleet off the channel of Corfu and defeated it in the ensuing naval battle. On July 19 the Turkish army reached the hills of the town and laid siege to the city. After repeated failed attempts and heavy fighting, the Turks were forced to raise the siege which had lasted 22 days.

There were also rumors spreading among the Turks that some of their soldiers saw St. Spyridon as a monk threatening them with a lit torch and that helped increase their panic. This victory over the Ottomans, therefore, was attributed not only to the leadership of Count Schulenburg who commanded the stubborn defense of the island against the Ottomans but also to the miraculous intervention of St. Spyridon.

After the victorious outcome of the battle, Venice honored Schulenburg and the Corfiotes for successfully defending the island. The great composer Vivaldi was commissioned to write an opera, Juditha triumphans, in celebration of the victory.

Feast day

Recognizing St. Spyridon's role in the defense of the island, Venice legislated the annual "Litany of St. Spyridon" on August 11 as a commemoration of the event. His feast day is celebrated in the East on the Saturday before Great Lent (known as "Cheesefare Saturday") and December 12.  For those Eastern Churches that follow the traditional Julian Calendar, December 12 falls on December 25 of the modern Gregorian Calendar.  In the West he is commemorated on December 14.

Other

St. Spyridon is also the patron saint of the Tolstoy family. Andrei Tolstoy (fl. 15th century) chose St. Spyridon as the family's saint and he remains so in both branches. The Grand Prince of Muscovy Basil II (1425–1462) apparently gave a gold cross containing relics of the saint to Andrei. This reliquary survives and is held by the senior member of the Tolstoy family, now Nikolai Tolstoy.

References

External links
St. Spyridon and other religious traditions on Corfu
St Spyridon the Wonderworker, Bishop of Tremithus Orthodox icon and synaxarion
 Spyridon of Trimythountos
 Saint Spyridon
 The life of Saint Spyridon
 Holy Metropolis of Trimythous, Church of Cyprus
Colonnade Statue in St Peter's Square

270 births
348 deaths
4th-century Christian saints
Bishops of the Greek Orthodox Church of Antioch
Roman Cyprus
Cypriot saints
Miracle workers
History of Corfu
Shepherds
4th-century bishops in the Roman Empire
Cypriot bishops
People from Famagusta District